MS Bergensfjord is a cruise ferry owned and operated by the Norwegian ferry operator, Fjord Line who use her on their Hirtshals - Langesund route.
The ship was ordered in March 2010, launched in March 2013 and then delivered to Fjord Line on 3 February 2014, Bergensfjord is the sister of the 2013 built Stavangerfjord. Like her sister, she ran exclusively on liquefied natural gas from 2013 to 2022, when the 2021–2023 global energy crisis increased LNG price to uneconomic levels, and Fjord decided to replace the LNG-only engines with dual-fuel engines.

References

External links
 Fjord Line Website
 Video of the launch of Bergensfjord

Cruiseferries
2013 ships
Ships built in Gdańsk